Karolína Plíšková was the defending champion and successfully defended her title, defeating Madison Keys in the final, 6–4, 4–6, 7–5. Plíšková won the title after saving a match point Naomi Osaka had against her in the semifinals.

Seeds

The top two seeds received a bye into the second round.

Draw

Finals

Top half

Bottom half

Qualifying

Seeds

Qualifiers

Qualifying draw

First qualifier

Second qualifier

Third qualifier

Fourth qualifier

References

External links
Main Draw
Qualifying Draw

Singles